Busveal is a mining settlement in west Cornwall, United Kingdom. It is located approximately one mile east of Redruth. It is in the civil parish of St Day.

References

External links

Villages in Cornwall